The Boils were an American oi! / punk rock band from Philadelphia officially formed in 1996. Their most popular song, "The Orange and The Black", is used after every Philadelphia Flyers win as of April 13, 2006. They have also played on the Warped Tour and toured the country with similar bands Oxymoron and the Casualties.

Discography

Studio albums
 World Poison (1999) Cyclone Records
 Pride and Persecution (2002) TKO Records
 From The Bleachers (2005) TKO Records

Singles and EPs
 Hearts Of The Oppressed (1995) Creep
 Consuming Your Culture (split 7-inch with Sleepasaurus) (1995)  Switchblade 
 Tradition Ends (split 7-inch with Violent Society) (1996) Schuylkill 
 All He Ever Wanted Was A Good Education / Obedience Is Your Obligation (split 7-inch with The Goons) (1996) Torque
 Anthems From The New Generation (7-inch) (1997) Beer City
 When The Sun Goes Down (1998) Creep
 Punk Rock Rumble!! (split 7-inch with The Staggers) (1999) Haunted Town
 Fight for Your Class, Not for Your Country! (split 7-inch with Brigate Rozze) (1999) Mad Butcher
 The Boils / Disorderly Conduct (split 7-inch with Disorderly Conduct) (2000) Squigtone
 Nobility & Nihilism (split CD with Last Target) (2003) Interference 
 The Ripping Water E.P. (2003) Thorp 
 The Boils / Thumbs Up! (split 7-inch with Thumbs Up!) (2006) Knife Or Death 
 Hockey Anthems - The Orange And The Black (2007) TKO Records

Compilation and live albums
 Dad, I Can't Breathe (1995) Creep
 Matthau Records Comp (1996)
 More Kaos (1997) Motherbox
 Destroy The Creep House (1997) Creep
 Songs for the Witching Season (1997) Creep
 Don't Pogo in the Livingroom (1997) Pogostick
 Songs from the Gutter (1998) Kangaroo
 Welcome to Ground Zero (1998) Ground Zero
 Philly Shreds (1998) Schuykill
 Greasers, Punks, & Skins (1999) Squigtone
 Scene Killer Vol 2 (1999) Outsider
 Streets of Philadelphia (1999) Wonka Vision
 The Feeding of the Proles (1999) Patriotic Dissent
 Pure Punk (1999) Cyclone
 Black Eyes and Broken Bottles...We're Done Being Harassed (1999) Beer City
 Dangerously Unstable (1999) Suburban Voice
 Nevermind the Sex Pistols...Here's the Tribute (2000) Radical
 Skins and Pinz (2001) GMM
 The Last Stake Has Been Driven (2001) Creep
 Lesson for Today (2002) Almost Good Music
 Backstreets of American Oi! Street Punk Vol. 2: Ten Years Later'' (2006) CD Baby

References

Musical groups from Philadelphia
Oi! groups
Punk rock groups from Pennsylvania